The Elkhorn Hills are a low mountain range in the Transverse Ranges, in eastern San Luis Obispo County, California.

They are near the Elk Hills on the east in Kern County, California

References 

Mountain ranges of San Luis Obispo County, California
Transverse Ranges
Geography of the San Joaquin Valley
Hills of California
Mountain ranges of Southern California